Nwe or NWE may refer to:

 Nwe (surname)
 Ngwe language (ISO 639-3 code: new)
 Nordhausen-Wernigerode Railway Company
 North West England